is a Japanese cross-country skier who competes internationally. He represented his country at the 2022 Winter Olympics.

Cross-country skiing results
All results are sourced from the International Ski Federation (FIS).

Olympic Games

Distance reduced to 30 km due to weather conditions.

World Championships

World Cup

Season standings

References

External links

Japanese male cross-country skiers
2000 births
Living people
Olympic cross-country skiers of Japan
Cross-country skiers at the 2022 Winter Olympics
Competitors at the 2023 Winter World University Games
Medalists at the 2023 Winter World University Games
21st-century Japanese people
Universiade medalists in cross-country skiing
Universiade gold medalists for Japan
Universiade bronze medalists for Japan